Omodysplasia type 2 is a very rare genetic disorder characterised by abnormalities in the skull, long bones and genitourinary system.

Clinical features

These can be grouped under those evident in the skull/face, the long bones and the genitourinary system

Skull
Anteverted nostrils
Bifid nasal tip
Depressed nasal bridge
Fontal bossing
Long philtrum
Low set ears

Long bones
Short first metacarpal 
Short humerus

Genitourinary
Genitourinary hypoplasia

Genetics

This condition is inherited in an autosomal dominant fashion. 

Mutations in the  Frizzled Class Receptor 2 (FZD2) gene have been associated with this condition.

Diagnosis

Differential diagnosis

Robinow syndrome

Treatment

There is no currently known treatment for this condition.

History

This condition was first described by Maroteaux et al in 1989.

References

External links 

Rare diseases